The Bankura Unnayani Institute of Engineering or BUIE is a private (TEQUIP-II funded) sponsored engineering college in West Bengal, India providing under-graduate as well as post-graduate courses in engineering and technology disciplines. It was established in 1998 as the first engineering college in Bankura district.The college is affiliated with Maulana Abul Kalam Azad University of Technology and all the programmes are approved by the All India Council for Technical Education.

The campus is located at Subhankar Nagar, Puabagan, Bankura.

Academics

The institute offers seven undergraduate courses:-

B.Tech in Electronics and Communication Engineering (ECE)- 4 years [Approved intake - 120]
B.Tech in Applied Electronics and Instrumentation Engineering (AEIE)- 4 years [Approved intake - 30]
B.Tech in Electrical Engineering (EE)- 4 years [Approved intake - 60]
B.Tech in Mechanical Engineering (ME)- 4 years [Approved intake - 60]
B.Tech in Computer Science and Engineering (CSE)- 4 years [Approved intake - 60]
B.Tech in Civil Engineering (CE)- 4 years [Approved intake - 60]
B.Tech in Information Technology (IT)- 4 years [Approved intake - 30]

The following Postgraduate Degree Programs are offered:-

M.Tech. in VLSI & Microelectronics- 2 years [Approved intake - 18] 
M.Tech. in Computer Science & Engineering- 2 years [Approved intake - 18]

See also
 All India Council for Technical Education (AICTE)
 Maulana Abul Kalam Azad University of Technology

References

External links
 Official website

Colleges affiliated to West Bengal University of Technology
Engineering colleges in West Bengal
Universities and colleges in Bankura district
Educational institutions established in 1998
1998 establishments in West Bengal